The Ven John Carver, MA (1741 – 1814) was an Anglican Archdeacon.

Life
Carver's father John Carver, of Westminster, was an illegitimate son of John Carver of St' George's, Hanover Square; whose daughter and heiress Mary married John Ward, 1st Viscount Dudley and Ward, as his second wife.

Carver was educated at Oriel College, Oxford, where he matriculated in 1759. He held livings at Dudley, Himley, Hartlebury and Kingswinford; and was Archdeacon of Stafford from 1769 to 1782, and of Surrey from 1795 until his death on 1 August 1814. His daughter Elizabeth Carver married as his second wife, and survived, Charles Peter Layard.

Notes

1741 births
Alumni of Oriel College, Oxford
Archdeacons of Lichfield
Archdeacons of Surrey
1814 deaths
People from Westminster